Konstantin Leonidovich Kokora (born 27 March 1957) is a former competitive figure skater. He is the 1979 Soviet national champion and finished 10th at the 1980 Winter Olympics.

Results

References

Navigation

1957 births
Living people
Russian male single skaters
Soviet male single skaters
Olympic figure skaters of the Soviet Union
Figure skaters at the 1980 Winter Olympics
Figure skaters from Moscow
Universiade medalists in figure skating
Universiade gold medalists for the Soviet Union
Competitors at the 1981 Winter Universiade